Simon Legare (born September 26, 1989) is a Canadian football offensive lineman who is currently a free agent. Born in Montreal, Quebec, Legare played CIS football with the Montreal Carabins.

Professional career

Montreal Alouettes
In the 2013 CFL Draft Legare was drafted by the Montreal Alouettes of the Canadian Football League. He was selected in the 6th round with the 3 pick (47th overall). He signed with the Al's on May 13, 2013.

References

External links
 

1989 births
Living people
Canadian football offensive linemen
Players of Canadian football from Quebec
Canadian football people from Montreal